Craugastor spatulatus is a species of frog in the family Craugastoridae. It is endemic to Mexico and known from Cuautlapam in central Veracruz and Vista Hermosa in the Sierra Juárez, Oaxaca. Its natural habitat is cloud forest. This formerly abundant species has strongly declined because of habitat loss, although other factors may have been involved too.

References

spatulatus
Endemic amphibians of Mexico
Amphibians described in 1939
Taxa named by Hobart Muir Smith
Taxonomy articles created by Polbot